The 1987 Florida State Seminoles football team represented Florida State University in the 1987 NCAA Division I-A football season. The team was coached by Bobby Bowden and played their home games at Doak Campbell Stadium. The team was selected national champion by Berryman.

Schedule

Roster

Rankings

Game summaries

Texas Tech

at East Carolina

Memphis State

at Michigan State

Miami (FL)

at Southern Miss

Louisville

Tulane

at Auburn

Furman

at Florida

vs. Nebraska (Fiesta Bowl)

References

Florida State
Florida State Seminoles football seasons
Fiesta Bowl champion seasons
Florida State Seminoles football